Chain linking is a statistical method, defined by the Organisation for Economic Co-operation and Development as:

Chain linking is popularly used with gross domestic product/gross national income data, to measure changes over time, giving a chained volume series.

References

Index numbers
Time series